Alan Simpson (born October 2, 1983), is an American actor who appeared in the TV series Pasadena as Henry Bellow, Gilmore Girls as Keebler, This Is How the World Ends as Casper Van Dyke, and Freaks and Geeks as Tom. Simpson has carried additional supporting roles in films,  such as The Last Five Years, Swelter as "Ronnie", as well as numerous other films.

Filmography

Film

Television

References

External links
 

1983 births
Living people
American male television actors